The Box Butte County Courthouse, which is located on Box Butte Ave. between E. 5th and 6th Sts. in Alliance, Nebraska, is a historic building that was built in 1913.  It was designed by Rose & Peterson in Beaux Arts architectural style.

It was listed on the National Register of Historic Places in 1990.

References

External links 
More photos of the Box Butte County Courthouse at Wikimedia Commons

Courthouses on the National Register of Historic Places in Nebraska
Beaux-Arts architecture in Nebraska
Government buildings completed in 1913
Buildings and structures in Box Butte County, Nebraska
1913 establishments in Nebraska
Historic districts on the National Register of Historic Places in Nebraska
National Register of Historic Places in Box Butte County, Nebraska